Raelee Thompson captained the Australian Women's Cricket team on four occasions. She was born on 3 August 1945 in Shepparton, Victoria and made her Test debut against New Zealand in 1972.
A right-handed batswoman and right arm fast-medium bowler, she scored 162 runs in her 16 tests and took 57 wickets at 18.24 with a best of 5 for 33. She played 23 One Day Internationals, scoring 207 runs and taking 24 wickets at 18.66. She played her last Test against England in 1985.

Thompson is the oldest player in test cricket to take a maiden 5 wicket haul when she did so against England in 1985 at 39 years and 175 days of age. In that match, Thompson captained Australia to victory, reclaiming the Ashes for the first time in 30 years.

She was awarded life membership of Cricket Victoria in 2018.Thompson was inducted into the Australian Cricket Hall of Fame in 2022.

References

External links
 Raelee Thompson at CricketArchive
 Raelee Thompson at southernstars.org.au

1945 births
Australia women Test cricketers
Australia women One Day International cricketers
Cricketers from Victoria (Australia)
Living people
People from Shepparton
Victoria women cricketers